The Minister Assisting the President of Nauru is a senior position in the Cabinet of Nauru, and responsible for acting as the Vice-President of Nauru. 

The President appoints the person holding this position among the members of the cabinet.

The Minister Assisting the President of Nauru succeeded to the Presidency once. President Bernard Dowiyogo died in March 2003, and was succeeded by Derog Gioura.

List

References

 
Political office-holders in Nauru
Government ministers of Nauru
Government of Nauru
Vice presidents
1968 establishments in Nauru